Operation Skua Polar I was an exploratory operation by Chile in the Chilean Antarctic Territory. Led by Colonel Valentín Segura, the expedition explored much of Antarctica for Chile.

References 
Chilean Joint Peacekeeping Operations Centre
THE CHILEAN ARMY, WALKING TO THE SOUTH POLE

Chilean Antarctic Territory
Territorial claims in Antarctica
Chile and the Antarctic
Antarctic expeditions
1980 in Antarctica
1981 in Antarctica